Susan Jeffers (March 3, 1938 – October 27, 2012, 74 years old) was an American psychologist and author of self-help literature.

Early life and education 

Susan Jeffers was born Susan Gildenberg at Hazleton, Pennsylvania on March 3, 1938.

Susan Jeffers started her academic education at Penn State University, but abandoned her studies when she married her first husband. In the years following 1960 the family moved to Manhattan, where Jeffers took degrees, followed by a doctorate in psychology, at Hunter College and at Columbia University.

Work 
In 1971 Susan Jeffers became executive director of the Floating Hospital in New York.
Then she taught a course about fear at the New School for Social Research

Her self-help book Feel the Fear and Do It Anyway, published in 1987, sold millions of copies and was translated into more than thirty-five languages. In addition to her work as an author Jeffers also held workshops and seminars.

Susan Jeffers died of cancer of unknown primary origin on October 27, 2012 in Los Angeles, California.

References

External links 
Official website

1938 births
2012 deaths
American women psychologists
20th-century American psychologists
Hunter College alumni
Columbia University alumni
People from Hazleton, Pennsylvania
People from Los Angeles
Deaths from cancer in California
21st-century American women